Sviðnur is an island in the Skáleyjar region of Westfjords, Iceland.

Islands of Iceland